Fahd Aktaou (born 13 January 1993) is a Dutch professional footballer who plays as a left-back.

Club career
He formerly played for SC Heerenveen, who loaned hom to Almere City. He joined Heracles in summer 2014, only to be loaned out again to FC Dordrecht in summer 2015. He was expelled from the Dordrecht squad in February 2016 for undisclosed reasons.

In June 2016 Aktaou joined Moroccan side WAC Casablanca.

In the summer of 2018 he moved to Italy, signing with third-tier Serie C club Juve Stabia. He was released from his Juve Stabia contract by mutual consent on 10 January 2019.

References

External links
 Voetbal International profile 

1993 births
Living people
Dutch footballers
Footballers from Amsterdam
Dutch sportspeople of Moroccan descent
Association football fullbacks
SC Heerenveen players
Almere City FC players
Heracles Almelo players
FC Dordrecht players
Wydad AC players
S.S. Juve Stabia players
PFC Cherno More Varna players
Wigry Suwałki players
Eredivisie players
Eerste Divisie players
Serie C players
First Professional Football League (Bulgaria) players
II liga players
Dutch expatriate footballers
Expatriate footballers in Italy
Expatriate footballers in Bulgaria
Expatriate footballers in Poland